Teton County is the name of several counties in the United States:

Teton County, Idaho
Teton County, Montana
Teton County, Wyoming